La Maddalena (Italian: Santa Maria Maddalena in Cannaregio, usually referred to simply as La Maddalena) is a church in Venice, Italy, in the sestiere of Cannaregio.

A religious edifice is known in the site as early as 1222, owned by the Balbo patrician family. When, in the mid-14th century, the Venetian Senate established a public holiday for Mary Magdalene's feast, it was decided to enlarge the church, including a watchtower which was turned into a bell tower.

The church was restored in the early 18th century, but in 1780 it was entirely rebuilt under design by Tommaso Temanza, with a circular plan inspired by the Pantheon in Rome. The bell tower was demolished in 1888. The most notable feature is the portal, with masonic symbols over the door (probably connected to the Balbo's membership in the Knights Templar). The interior has an hexagonal plan with four side chapels and a presbytery.

Outside the apse is a 15th-century basrelief of the Madonna with Child.

References

External links

The Churches of Venice website
www.venipedia.org wiki page

Roman Catholic churches completed in 1780
Maddalena
Maddalena
Maddalena
Churches completed in 1580
Roman Catholic churches completed in the 1580s
Centralized-plan churches in Italy
Tommaso Temanza buildings
Neoclassical church buildings in Italy